Sorá is a corregimiento in Chame District, Panamá Oeste Province, Panama, with a population of 1,653 as of 2010. Its population as of 1990 was 1,082; its population as of 2000 was 1,290.

References

Corregimientos of Panamá Oeste Province